James Edwin "Gravy" Patterson Jr., also known as Pat Patterson, (March 26, 1934 – October 11, 2007) was an American college baseball coach. He served as the head baseball coach at Louisiana Tech University in Ruston, Louisiana from 1968 to 1990, compiling a record of 741–462–2 record. Patterson produced 18 winning seasons in 23 years, and his teams won 40 or more games in five of those years. He was Southland Conference Coach of the Year seven times. 

In retirement, he often returned as an interim coach. Seven of Patterson's players, including Mike Jeffcoat, Phil Hiatt, and David Segui, reached the majors.

Education
Patterson was born in Delhi in Richland Parish in northeastern Louisiana. He graduated from Louisiana Tech in 1958, playing football and baseball under legendary Bulldog coaches Joe Aillet and Berry Hinton. He earned four football letters and two baseball letters and went on to earn his master’s degree from the University of Mississippi ("Ole Miss") in 1961.

Coaching career
 
He began his coaching career in 1958 at Ouachita Parish High School in Monroe and took a job at C.E. Byrd High School in Shreveport in 1963 before he joined the Louisiana Tech athletic department in 1967 as an assistant football coach. 

Patterson would serve as both assistant football- and head baseball coach at Tech from 1968 to 1978 and as head baseball coach only until 1990. He subsequently oversaw one more football game, having served as interim coach in 1979, when the Bulldogs posted a 13-10 win over local rival Northeast Louisiana University, now known as the University of Louisiana at Monroe, in his only game as head coach. 

As head coach, Patterson was named the District VI Coach of the Year in 1974. He led Louisiana Tech to seven National Collegiate Athletic Association Tournament appearances during his coaching tenure, the last in 1987. In 1974, Patterson led the Bulldogs to within one game from the College World Series. 

Patterson served for several years as Tech’s associate athletic director following his retirement in 1990. In that capacity, he oversaw the eligibility of athletes and monitored NCAA compliance. On three occasions, he was asked to step in as the university’s interim athletic director. 

He is a member of the Louisiana Tech Athletic Hall of Fame. A large poster of Patterson hangs on the outfield wall of Louisiana Tech's baseball stadium.

Murder-suicide
According to police reports, Patterson was overcome with grief for his wife, the former Glenda Bates (born ca. 1936), an Alzheimer's patient at the Arbor House assisted-care facility near Ruston. He went into the building on October 11, shot Mrs. Patterson to death, and then turned the gun on himself. Lincoln Parish Sheriff Mike Stone said that no one else was attacked in the commission of the crime.

References

1934 births
2007 suicides
Louisiana Tech Bulldogs baseball coaches
Louisiana Tech Bulldogs baseball players
Louisiana Tech Bulldogs football coaches
Louisiana Tech Bulldogs football players
High school football coaches in Louisiana
University of Mississippi alumni
People from Delhi, Louisiana
Coaches of American football from Louisiana
Players of American football from Louisiana
Baseball coaches from Louisiana
Baseball players from Louisiana
2007 murders in the United States
Murder–suicides in Louisiana
Suicides by firearm in Louisiana
American United Methodists
20th-century Methodists
21st-century Methodists